Christos Koutsospyros (born 14 October 1981) is a Greek footballer. He currently plays for A.E. Ermionida F.C.

Career
Born in Agrinio, Koutsospyros began his playing career with local team Panetolikos.

References

External links
Profile at Onsports.gr
 Profile in Greek

1981 births
Living people
Greek footballers
Panetolikos F.C. players
Panachaiki F.C. players
Kallithea F.C. players
Atromitos F.C. players
PAS Giannina F.C. players
Kalamata F.C. players
Veria F.C. players
Pierikos F.C. players
Association football forwards
Footballers from Agrinio